Jean Sinoël (13 August 1868 – 30 August 1949), often known simply as Sinoël, was a French actor and singer.

Born Jean Léonis Blès in Sainte-Terre, Gironde, France, he died in Paris in 1949.

Selected filmography
 Captain Craddock (1931)
 Kiss Me (1932)
 Bach the Millionaire (1933)
 Étienne (1933)
 Jeanne (1934)
 Cease Firing (1934)
 Night in May (1934)
 Aux portes de Paris (1934)
 An Ideal Woman (1934)
 The Last Billionaire (1934)
 Madame Angot's Daughter (1935)
 A Hen on a Wall (1936)
 The Man from Nowhere (1937)
  (1938)
 Gargousse (1938)
 Caprices (1942)
 Mademoiselle Béatrice (1943)
 The Inevitable Monsieur Dubois (1943)
 Madly in Love (1943)
 Boule de suif (1945)
 The Bellman (1945)
 That's Not the Way to Die (1946)
 Dilemma of Two Angels (1948)
 Night Round (1949)

External links

1868 births
1949 deaths
French male film actors
French male singers
People from Gironde
20th-century French male actors